The 2007 Idaho Vandals football team represented the University of Idaho during the 2007 NCAA Division I FBS football season. Idaho competed as a member of the Western Athletic Conference (WAC), and played their home games on campus in the Kibbie Dome. The Vandals were led by first-year head coach Robb Akey, hired following the departure of Dennis Erickson for Arizona State in December 2006.

The Vandals were winless in eight conference games and went 1–11 overall, which was Idaho's eighth consecutive season with a losing record. The sole victory came in early September against Cal Poly-SLO, an FCS program.

Akey was previously the defensive coordinator at Washington State University in neighboring Pullman.

Schedule

Idaho's home attendance for 2007 was 68,874 for six games, an average of 11,479.The maximum was 14,205 for the Fresno State game on October 13,the minimum was 8,102 for the Utah State game on November 24, two days after Thanksgiving.

NFL Draft
One Vandal was selected in the 2008 NFL Draft; linebacker David Vobora was the final pick and the draft's Mr. Irrelevant. This ended a three-year drought in the NFL Draft for Idaho. The last Vandal selection was guard Jake Scott, four years earlier in 2004.

List of Idaho Vandals in the NFL Draft

References

External links
Idaho Argonaut – student newspaper – 2007 editions

Idaho
Idaho Vandals football seasons
Idaho Vandals football